Charles Blanchard may refer to:

 Charles Blanchard, UFC fighter in The Ultimate Fighter: Team Liddell vs. Team Ortiz
 Charles A. Blanchard (academic administrator) (1848–1925), second President of Wheaton College
 Émile Blanchard (Charles Émile Blanchard, 1819–1900), French biologist
 Charles V. Blanchard (1866–1939), American politician
 Charles A. Blanchard (lawyer) (born 1959), U.S. Air Force general counsel
 Charles D. Blanchard, politician, see Members of the South Dakota State Senate